The Imperial Bank Building (Persian: ساختمان بانک شاهی) is a historical building in Toopkhane Square Tehran, Iran. It was built during the Qajar era, dedicated to the Imperial Bank of Persia, but since the revolution in 1979 it is owned by the Tejarat Bank. It is listed in the national heritage sites of Iran with the number 7440.

It is the only old building remaining in Toopkhaneh square. The other buildings were Telegraphkhane and Tehran's municipality building.

References 

Buildings of the Qajar period
Buildings and structures in Tehran
National works of Iran